Philip Bester and Peter Polansky were the defending champions, but lost in the semifinals to Guilherme Clezar and Alejandro González.

Clezar and González won the title, defeating Saketh Myneni and Sanam Singh 3–6, 6–1, [12–10] in the final.

Seeds

Draw

References
Main Draw

Challenger Banque Nationale de Granby
Challenger de Granby